Allegory of Intemperance is an oil on wood painting by Hieronymus Bosch made . It is held in the Yale University Art Gallery, in New Haven, Connecticut.

This panel is the left inside bottom wing of a hinged triptych. The other identified parts are The Ship of Fools, which formed the upper left panel,  and the Death and the Miser, which was the right panel; The Wayfarer was painted on the right panel rear. The central panel, if it existed, is unknown.

The Allegory represented a condemnation of gluttony, in the same way the right panel condemned avarice. The fragment shows a fat man riding a barrel in a kind of lake or pool. He is surrounded by other people, who push him or pour a liquid from the barrel.  Below, a man swims with, above his head, a vessel with meat. The swimmer's clothes lie on the shore at bottom. On the right, under a hut, a couple is devoted to lascivious acts, perhaps induced by drunkenness.

References

External links
Page at the museum's official website

Paintings by Hieronymus Bosch
1490s paintings
15th-century allegorical paintings
Allegorical paintings by Dutch artists
Paintings in the Yale University Art Gallery
Food and drink paintings